Mexican theater can refer to:

 Mexican Drug War, the Mexican theater of the US war on drugs
 National Theatre of Mexico
 National Theatre Company of Mexico